Michael Richie Onovwigun (born 9 April 1996 in Clapham, England) is a retired English semi-professional footballer who played as a central midfielder. He was a product of the Brentford academy and began his professional career with Chesterfield in 2014. After his release in 2016, Onovwigun embarked on a journeyman career in non-League football before retiring in 2020.

Playing career

Brentford 
Born in Clapham, London, Onovwigun began his career in the academy at Brentford and signed a two-year scholarship during the 2012 off-season. After featuring regularly for the Development Squad in friendly matches during the 2012–13 pre-season, Onovwigun was called into the first team squad for a friendly versus Wycombe Wanderers on 7 August 2012 and he replaced Jake Reeves after 73 minutes of the 4–1 victory. Onovwigun made over 50 appearances for the youth team and 9 for the Development Squad between 2011 and 2014 and departed the club at the end of the 2013–14 season, after failing to be offered a professional contract.

Chesterfield 
On 31 July 2014, Onovwigun signed a one-year professional Development Squad contract at League One club Chesterfield after a successful trial. He received his maiden call into the first team squad for a league match versus Rochdale on 16 August and made his professional debut when he came on as an 89th-minute substitute for Jimmy Ryan in a 2–1 win. After spending time away on loan, he had a run of three first team calls in March 2015 and made one substitute appearance against Gillingham in the middle of the month. Onovwigun finished the 2014–15 season with three appearances and the option to extend his contract was taken up for another season. Onovwigun made his only appearance of the 2015–16 season as a substitute during a 3–1 League Cup first round extra time defeat to Carlisle United on 11 August 2015 and he was released at the end of the campaign.

Sheffield (loan) 
Onovwigun joined Northern Premier League First Division South club Sheffield on a 28-day loan on 7 November 2014 and the deal was later extended until 3 January 2015. He made eight appearances and scored two goals for the club.

Stalybridge Celtic (loan) 
On 6 February 2015, Onovwigun and Chesterfield teammate Charlie Dawes signed on a one-month loan for Conference North club Stalybridge Celtic. He made his debut the following day, coming on for Paul Ennis after 69 minutes of a 4–3 defeat to local rivals Stockport County. It proved to be his only appearance and he departed on 27 February.

Gateshead (loan) 
On 24 March 2016, Onovwigun joined National League club Gateshead on loan until the end of the 2015–16 season. He made three appearances before returning to the Spireites at the end of the season.

Non-league football 
On 16 August 2016, Onovwigun was announced as having signed for Isthmian League Premier Division club Dulwich Hamlet. He made just two appearances for the club, before moving within the division to join Kingstonian on 31 August. After 11 appearances and two goals, he joined Southern League First Division Central club Farnborough on 24 November. Onovwigun moved back up to the National League to join Southport on 7 January 2017 and returned to the Isthmian League Premier Division to sign for Merstham on 6 March.

Onovwigun rejoined Dulwich Hamlet at the beginning of the 2017–18 season and was a part of the team which secured promotion to the National League South, though he did not feature in Hamlet's successful Isthmian League Premier Division play-off campaign. After signing a new contract, Onovwigun joined Isthmian League Premier Division club Carshalton Athletic on a three-month loan in September 2018 and after returning to Dulwich Hamlet for the second half of the 2018–19 season, he rejoined Carshalton on a permanent basis during the 2019 off-season.

Onovwigun made two early-2019–20 season appearances for Carshalton Athletic, before transferring to division rivals Lewes in late August 2019. Until his release in December 2019, Onovwigun was a regular member of the Lewes team and he moved up to the National League South to join Dartford in January 2020. After just one appearance for the Darts, he joined Isthmian League South Central Division club Staines Town on a dual-registration deal in February and then moved to North Division club Maldon & Tiptree on a permanent transfer in early March. Onovwigun made three appearances for the Jammers, before the 2019–20 Isthmian League season was ended early. He announced his retirement from non-League football in July 2020.

Sunday league football 
In 2020, Onovwigun dropped into Sunday league football and joined Orpington & Bromley District Sunday League Senior Division club Lambeth Allstars.

Personal life 
Onovwigun attended a football and education programme at the University of East London.

Career statistics

References

External links 

1996 births
Living people
English footballers
Footballers from Clapham
English Football League players
Brentford F.C. players
Chesterfield F.C. players
Association football midfielders
Sheffield F.C. players
Northern Premier League players
Stalybridge Celtic F.C. players
National League (English football) players
Gateshead F.C. players
Isthmian League players
Dulwich Hamlet F.C. players
Kingstonian F.C. players
Southport F.C. players
Southern Football League players
Farnborough F.C. players
Merstham F.C. players
Carshalton Athletic F.C. players
Alumni of the University of East London
Lewes F.C. players
Dartford F.C. players
Staines Town F.C. players
Maldon & Tiptree F.C. players